The J.League 1993 season was the inaugural season of the J.League Division 1. The league fixtures began on 15 May 1993, and ended on 15 December 1993.  The first ever Suntory Championship took place in the following year, 9 January and 16 January 1994.

Honours

Clubs

Ten clubs participated in J.League during 1993 season:

 Kashima Antlers
 Urawa Red Diamonds
 JEF United Ichihara
 Verdy Kawasaki
 Yokohama Marinos
 Yokohama Flügels
 Shimizu S-Pulse
 Nagoya Grampus Eight
 Gamba Osaka
 Sanfrecce Hiroshima

Format
In the first year, the league followed split-season format, and each halves (or stages) were known as Suntory Series and NICOS Series for sponsorship purposes.  In each series, ten clubs played in double round-robin format, a total of 18 games per club (per series).  The games went to golden-goal extra time and penalties if needed after regulation.  The clubs were ranked by number of wins, and tie breakers are, in the following order: 
 Goal differential 
 Goals scored 
 Head-to-head results
 Extra match or a coin toss
The club that finished at the top of the table is declared stage champion and qualifies for the Suntory Championship.  The first stage winner, hosts the first leg in the championship series.  If the same club win both stages, the runners-up of each stages plays against each other and the winners challenges the stage winner at the championship game.

Results

Final standings

Suntory Series (1st Stage) Standings

NICOS Series (2nd stage) Standings

Suntory Championship '93 

VERDY KAWASAKI won the series on 3-1 aggregate.

Overall standings

Average attendance 
In its first year, the league averaged 17,976 fans and had over 3.2 million fans total over the course of the season. The following chart shows the league ranked in terms of average attendance:

Awards 
MVP
 Kazuyoshi Miura
Rookie of the Year
Masaaki Sawanobori
Manager of the Year
 Yasutaro Matsuki

Best XI

References
 Source: J. League 1993 (RSSSF)

J1 League seasons
1
Japan
Japan